The  or Tonkararin tunnel structure is a 464.6 meter long, tunnel-like structure of unknown origin, situated in Nagomi, Kumamoto Prefecture, Japan. It lies on a plateau called Seibaru Daichi, around which are many kofun or tumuli, such as Eda-Funayama Kofun. It consists of very shallow natural slits of the ground covered with stones and man-made stone-structured underdrains. The name of Tonkararin came from the sound of a stone, when the stone is thrown into the tunnel. Another view is that it came from the Korean language. Korean Tongurami, similar to Tonkararin was a cave connected with religious functions.

General description
Tonkararin came to the attention of Kumamoto people when Sanpaku Koga noticed and reported them to the Kumamoto Prefecture on August 1974. In October, specialists of the cultural assets of Kumamoto Prefecture started to investigate it and an aqueduct hypothesis and a religion-associated hypothesis were suggested. In May 1975, Seicho Matsumoto, a noted novelist interested in archeology and Japanese ancient history, observed Tonkararin and proposed that it might be connected with Yamataikoku, leading to the nationwide interest in Tonkararin. In 1975, the aqueduct hypothesis was prevalent. In March 1978, the education committee of Kumamoto Prefecture suggested the aqueduct theory in its report. However, in June 1993, a re-investigation of Tonkararin of the team publicly denied the aqueduct theory. There have been no mythological legends in the neighboring area concerning Tonkararin.

Structure

The parts of Tonkararin are explained. A slit is a slit of tuff from volcanic ash, considered to be a slit from rain.
A-B: A lane which is thought to have been a slit (not included in the whole length)
B-C: 19.3 m. Underground stone masonry underdrain: tunnel made of stones
C-D: 37.7 m. The first slit with stone ceiling
D-E: 57.4 m. Lane
E-F: 31.0 m. The second slit with stone ceiling
F-G: 54.6 m. Lane
G-H: 37.1 m. Underground stone masonry underdrain (tunnel) with 7 stone steps
H-I: 15.7 m. Underground stone masonry underdrain
I-J: 58.7 m. Lane
J-K: 64.8 m. Underground stone masonry underdrain
K-L: 36.1 m. Underground stone masonry underdrain
L-M: 32.5 m. Underground stone masonry underdrain
Total length: 445.1 m.
Difference in height: 36.37 m.

Tonkararin Symposium on October 29, 2001 at Nagomi Town

At the symposium, previous views were reviewed. Tatsuo Inoue, Professor Emeritus of Tsukuba University suggested that Tonkararin might be connected with some religious function since rebirth from false death needs entering a cave or purification. Sanpaku Koga, Seiya Tida, Tomoshige Inoue, Tokunao Idemiya and Sachihiro Oota favored the view that Tonkararin was connected with some religious acts.

References
Sanpaku Koga, Yume, Yomigaeru (Dream Reborn) 1994, Sanko-Kai
Sanpaku Koga, Shoku Yume Yomigaeru (Part 2 Dream Reborn) 2003, Sanko-kai

Footnotes

External links
Tonkararin in Japanese retrieved on Oct. 14, 2012
Mysterious site Tonkararin retrieved on Oct. 14, 2012
Mysterious Tonkararin retrieved on Oct. 14, 2012
Nagomi Town Sightseeing Map retrieved on Oct. 14, 2012
Tonkararin You Tube retrieved on Oct. 14, 2012

Landforms of Kumamoto Prefecture
Archaeological sites in Japan